Eurylophella karelica is a species of Eurylophella.

It is native to Eastern Europe.

Synonym: Ephemerella karelica Tiensuu

References

Mayflies